COPE is an acronym for Challenging Outdoor Personal Experience, a program in the Boy Scouts of America. It consists of group initiative games, trust events, and high and low ropes course.  Some activities involve a group challenge, while others develop individual skills and agility.  Participants climb, swing, balance, jump, rappel, and devise solutions to a variety of problems.

History
In 1920, Kurt Hahn established the Salem School, based on principles personal responsibility, kindness, and justice towards developing the fitness and confidence of participants.  After being imprisoned in Germany then exiled to Great Britain in 1933, in 1941 Hahn established the Outward Bound program to train people for life by using the challenges of the sea and mountains.  The program includes rescue technique and service to people with the motto being, "Training through the body, not of the body."  In 1970, Project Adventure began as a curriculum program in Massachusetts, since becoming a clearinghouse for adventure-based programs.  In 1975, Scouts from the Pony Express Council experienced NORJAM, the Ropes Course at the 14th World Scout Jamboree in Norway, including Scout executive Parvin Bishop.  In 1981, the Pony Express Council built the BSA's first COPE course at the council's Camp Geiger near St. Joseph, Missouri.  When Bishop became Director of Program at the BSA National Office, he took the program national and in 1983, the BSA National Council made Project COPE part of the BSA camping program and began offering training through the National Camping School.

In 1980 a team of staff and volunteers in Pony Express Council developed a Rope Course and Orienteering program under then Scout Executive Parvin Bishop as part of the council's long range planning. Bishop named the new program Project COPE. The following professionals worked with Bishop on building and marketing the Project COPE program in its first few years:  Al Vasey, Rich Cole, Curt Palmer,  Bill Pennistion and Warren Wenner. The first two years of the Pony Express Council's Project COPE program had two days of ropes course programs and low course events and one day of  Orienteering programs. After two years the Project  COPE program cut the day of orienteering program. Warren Wenner then a staff member  served as the 1st Project COPE Director for the Council's Project  program from 1980 to 1983 and also  served as the 1st Course Director for National  Camp School Camp Project COPE section held at Camp  Jayhawk in Kansas. Bill Penniston another staff member wrote the 1st Program COPE handbook that was edited by both Penniston and Wenner. Both helped national write the 1st national camping standards and national guide book as Project COPE became a national program. Council Staff member Rich Cole served as the Summer Camp COPE in 1980 which was the 1st summer that Project COPE was a program at Camp Gieger. Wenner worked with Rich that first summer serving as Camp Gieger Camp Director. Curt Palmer Council staff member worked across the central region working with councils on building Project COPE courses. He also served on Project COPE National Camp School Staff  ( staff member from 1979 to 1983 and Scouting magazine story Jan-Feb 1983 titled "Learning to COPE" ).

Goals
Each Project COPE program emphasizes eight goals.

 communication
 planning
 trust
 teamwork
 leadership
 decision-making
 problem-solving
 and self-esteem

See also
Ropes course

References

Boy Scouts of America
Outdoor education organizations
1981 establishments in the United States